The 2021 Russian Cup Final was the 29th Russian Cup Final, the final match of the 2020–21 Russian Cup. It was played at Nizhny Novgorod Stadium in Nizhny Novgorod, Russia, on 21 May 2021, contested by FC Lokomotiv Moscow and Krylia Sovetov Samara. Lokomotiv won the match 3–1. It was the second occasion in a row in which a second-tier FNL club qualified for the final. Same as was the case in the previous final with Khimki, by the time the final was played, the FNL team already secured promotion into the Russian Premier League.

Because of the COVID-19 pandemic in Russia, attendance was limited to 50% of the arena's capacity.

Lokomotiv Moscow qualified for the 2021–22 UEFA Europa League by winning the cup.

Route to the final

Lokomotiv Moscow

Krylia Sovetov Samara

Match

Details

References

Russian Cup finals
Russian Cup
Cup
FC Lokomotiv Moscow matches
PFC Krylia Sovetov Samara matches